Yoav Pini Gerafi (sometimes Jarafi or Jerafi, ; born 29 August 1993) is an Israeli footballer who plays as a goalkeeper for Israeli Premier League club F.C. Ashdod.

Early life
Gerafi was born in Tel Mond, Israel, to a family of Mizrahi Jewish (Yemenite-Jewish) descent.

Club career
Gerafi made his professional debut for Hapoel Ra'anana in the Israeli Premier League on 14 February 2015, coming on as a substitute in the 14th minute for Shoval Gozlan after starting goalkeeper Daniel Lifshitz was sent off in the 11th minute. The match finished as a 2–1 win for Hapoel Ra'anana.

International career
In March 2019, Gerafi was first called up to the senior Israel national team ahead of the UEFA Euro 2020 qualifying matches against Slovenia and Austria. He made his debut on 27 September 2022 in a friendly game against Malta.

See also
List of Jewish footballers
List of Jews in sports
List of Israelis

References

External links
 
 
 

1993 births
Living people
Israeli footballers
People from Tel Mond
Footballers from Central District (Israel)
Israel international footballers
Association football goalkeepers
Hapoel Kfar Saba F.C. players
F.C. Ashdod players
Hapoel Ra'anana A.F.C. players
Hapoel Tel Aviv F.C. players
Hapoel Hadera F.C. players
Israeli Premier League players
Liga Leumit players
Israeli people of Yemeni-Jewish descent
Israeli Mizrahi Jews
Israeli Jews
Jewish footballers